North Bengal State Library is the largest library in the North Bengal region of India. It is situated in the Cooch Behar city area.

History
The North Bengal State Library is the pride of Cooch Behar. This library has many valuable and Classic manuscripts ("Punthis")  written on hand made papers and palm leaves. There are many rare books, old journals, rare documents, and reports of both Indian and foreign origin. The library supports the preservation of the cultural heritage of the Cooch Behar Kingdom.

The library has a long history of 125 years. During the reign of Maharaja Nripendra Narayan, Colonel J C Houghten was the acting Commissioner of Cooch Behar (1864–73). Maharaja Nripenda Narayan established the State Library of Cooch Behar in 1870 using a collection of rare books obtained from the auction sale of M/S Rozario & Co. of London. It was opened to the public in 1882. At first, the library was housed in a "Nilkuthi" (A specifically European house or bus.) In 1895, it was handed over to the Maharaja Sir Nripendra Narayan who moved the library to Lansdown Hall, now the District Magistrate's Office.

The Maharaja of Cooch Behar fostered the growth of this library by sanctioning Rs.2,000 (or what was then ~US$10,000) as an annual grant for the purchase of books. Different punthis, manuscripts, and rare Raj-Darawabar (royal-court) documents were transferred to this library for public use and viewing.

Today, the library has become a repository for important documents, reports, journals and rare manuscripts. Many of the materials are centuries old.

In 1949, on the eve of merger of the Cooch Behr State with the Indian Union, the Library was run by five employees, including one Librarian and was under the direct control of the State Council Minister. After the merge, the library went under the control of the Education Department and thus the District Magistrate. Its staff was reduced to one Librarian and one other worker.

In a joint meeting with the prominent citizens of the Cooch Behar town on 13-NOV-1967 in the chamber of the Deputy Commissioner (Cooch Behar) it was unanimously resolved to amalgamate the State Library with the District Library, Cooch Behar. The District Library of Cooch Behar was established in 1957 under the sponsored Library scheme. According to the above resolution in 1968, the then Deputy Commissioner, Sri Bhaskar Ghosh, I.A.S., on the plea of saving the library sent a proposal of amalgamation with the District Library to the D.P.I., West Bengal.

On the basis of his proposal government accepted the merger and renamed the Library as "North Bengal State Library".

Location
The North Bengal State Library is situated in heart of the Cooch Behar town at the South-Eastern Corner of [Sagardighi] on M.J.N. Road.

Present collection
North Bengal State Library presently boosts a collection of over 75,000 books and many ancient manuscripts.

Membership policies
Any local people can become a permanent member by paying a nominal fee any outsider can become a temporary member and can read books in the reading room.

References

External links
 Main town of North Bengal, Siliguri
 North Bengal State Library

Public libraries in India
Libraries in West Bengal
Education in Cooch Behar district
Libraries established in 1833
1833 establishments in British India

Cooch Behar Archive